Arbour Hill is an area of Dublin within the inner city on the Northside of the River Liffey, in the Dublin 7 postal district. Arbour Hill, the road of the same name, runs west from Blackhall Place in Stoneybatter, and separates Collins Barracks, now hosting part of the National Museum of Ireland, to the south from Arbour Hill Prison to the north, whose graveyard includes the burial plot of the signatories of the Easter Proclamation that began the 1916 Rising. St Bricin's Military Hospital, formerly the King George V Hospital, is also located in Arbour Hill.

History 
Arbour Hill is derived from the Irish Cnoc an Arbhair which means "corn hill". The area was owned by Christ Church Cathedral during the medieval period and was used to store corn. The area first appears on a map in 1603 as "Earber-hill".   

As part of his commissioned symphonic work "Irishmen and Irishwomen", the composer Vincent Kennedy included a movement titled "Arbour Hill". This movement is a tribute to the Easter Rising participants buried at Arbour Hill.

Gallery

References

Places in Dublin (city)
Streets in Dublin (city)